Operating weight is a measure of the total weight of a vehicle or machine when it is in use, including all necessary components such as the driver or operator, fuel, and any additional equipment or tools required for its operation.

See also
 Operating empty weight - the weight of an aircraft when empty of fuel, crew, and payload

Vehicle design